Clifftop is an unincorporated community in Raleigh County, West Virginia, United States.

References 

Unincorporated communities in West Virginia
Unincorporated communities in Raleigh County, West Virginia